Jamie Michael Pittman (born 18 July 1981 in Brisbane, Queensland) is a professional Australian indigenous boxer in the middleweight division. He represented his nation Australia at the 2004 Summer Olympics finishing his amateur career with an incredible record of 187 fights 150 wins 37 losses, before turning himself into pro by the following year. From then on, Pittman held a record of twenty-five bouts throughout his professional career (twenty-two victories, eleven knockouts, and three losses).

Amateur career
Pittman started boxing as a form of rehabilitation at the age of ten, when he fell through the window that left him with 72 stitches in his arm. Since then, he trained most his sporting career for the Newcastle PCYC in Newcastle, New South Wales, and later selected to be the member of the boxing team under the Australian Institute of Sport in Canberra. Pittman sought his official bid to compete for the host nation at the 2000 Summer Olympics in Sydney, but the match was called off during the AIBA Oceania Qualification Tournament, because of a controversial decision. According to him, he got a cut under his eye, in which doctors presumed that it was counted as a punch from the opponent.

Pittman represented Australia at the 2002 Commonwealth Games. In his first bout, he defeated Hassan Mraba Mzonge of Tanzania, but lost his quarterfinal contest to Jean Pascal of Canada.
Pittman won 3 fights in 3 days to Win the gold medal at the 2003 Commonwealth Championships, beating Eamonn_OKane from Northern Ireland in the final. 
Pittman then qualified for the men's middleweight division (75 kg) at the 2004 Summer Olympics in Athens. Having trained eight years for his Olympic debut in Sydney and missed out, he bounced back to guarantee a spot on the Australian boxing team after finishing first from the AIBA Oceania Qualification Tournament in Tonga. Pittman suffered a contentious one-point defeat to Germany's Lukas Wilaschek with a tough 24–23 decision in his opening match.

Professional career
Shortly after the Games, Pittman turned himself into pro in 2005. Because of his unorthodox athleticism, tremendous amateur tactics, and daunting fists to punish his opponents, he was considered one of the young prospects in boxing. As of August 2014, Pittman obtains a combined record of twenty-two victories (8 KO) in twenty-five professional bouts with three defeats.

At the peak of his pro career, Pittman campaigned his defence with PABA and WBA Asia Pacific middleweight titles to establish an impressive 15–0 boxing record, until he swiftly moved into the super middleweight division three years after his pro debut.

On 5 April 2008, Pittman faced three-time defending WBA super middleweight champion Felix Sturm in Düsseldorf, Germany. He enjoyed his early success at the start of the match with two straight victories over Sturm upon the decision of the judges. After two rounds, Pittman continued to box Sturm with another quick punch, but his opponent rocked him at the very end with his right eye being severely cut. As the fight sustained in the fifth round, Sturm took control the ring, and knocked Pittman down with a body shot. With only 36 seconds left into the seventh round, he was floored and battered again by Sturm with a flurry of punches until referee Russell Mora stepped in to halt the fight, declaring Sturm a champion in a one-sided defence of his WBA middleweight title. Nevertheless, Pittman claimed a professional defeat in his sporting career for the first time, since he captained the Australian team at the Olympics.

Following his first ever defeat in pro career, Pittman bounced back to earn three boxing bouts and generated a boxing record of 18–1. In early 2010, Pittman's game plan had been overwhelmed with another debacle, after being knocked out by Ghana's Joseph Kwadjo for the IBF Australasian super middleweight title during the seventh round of their match at Le Montage Reception Centre in Sydney.

In 2011, Pittman lost the PABA super middleweight title to fellow Australian boxer Serge Yannick in an unprecedented second round of their match in Hobart, Tasmania. Two years later, Pittman restored his form in the boxing scene with a clinical shutout over Zac Awad in the eighth round of their match, and ultimately clinched the PABA super middleweight title at the Sydney Entertainment Centre, hastening his pro record to 22–3 (8 KO).

Professional boxing record

| style="text-align:center;" colspan="8"|22 Wins (8 knockouts, 14 decisions),  3 Losses, 0 Draws
|-  style="text-align:center; background:#e3e3e3;"
|  style="border-style:none none solid solid; "|Res.
|  style="border-style:none none solid solid; "|Record
|  style="border-style:none none solid solid; "|Opponent
|  style="border-style:none none solid solid; "|Type
|  style="border-style:none none solid solid; "|Round
|  style="border-style:none none solid solid; "|Date
|  style="border-style:none none solid solid; "|Location
|  style="border-style:none none solid solid; "|Notes
|-align=center
|Win
|22–3
|align=left| Zac Awad
|
|
|
|align=left|
|align=left|
|-align=center
|Loss
|21–3
|align=left| Serge Yannick
|
|
|
|align=left|
|align=left|
|-align=center
|Win
|21–2
|align=left| Tim Kanofski
|
|
|
|align=left|
|align=left|
|-align=center
|Win
|20–2
|align=left| Togasilimai Letoa
|
|
|
|align=left|
|align=left|
|-align=center
|Loss
|19–2
|align=left| Joseph Kwadjo
|
|
|
|align=left|
|align=left|
|-align=center
|Win
|19–1
|align=left| Frank Ciampa
|
|
|
|align=left|
|align=left|
|-align=center
|Win
|18–1
|align=left| Josh Clenshaw
|
|
|
|align=left|
|align=left|
|-align=center
|Win
|17–1
|align=left| Eduardo Rojas
|
|
|
|align=left|
|align=left|
|-align=center
|Loss
|16–1
|align=left| Felix Sturm
|
|
|
|align=left|
|align=left|
|-align=center
|Win
|16–0
|align=left| Andreas Seran
|
|
|
|align=left|
|align=left|
|-align=center
|Win
|15–0
|align=left| Tshepo Mashego
|
|
|
|align=left|
|align=left|
|-align=center
|Win
|14–0
|align=left| Nonoy Gonzales
|
|
|
|align=left|
|align=left|
|-align=center
|Win
|13–0
|align=left| Komgrit Nanakorn
|
|
|
|align=left|
|align=left|
|-align=center
|Win
|12–0
|align=left| William Gare
|
|
|
|align=left|
|align=left|
|-align=center
|Win
|11–0
|align=left| Paz Viejo
|
|
|
|align=left|
|align=left|
|-align=center
|Win
|10–0
|align=left| Somchai Chimlum
|
|
|
|align=left|
|align=left|
|-align=center
|Win
|9–0
|align=left| Anont Donpradith
|
|
|
|align=left|
|align=left|
|-align=center
|Win
|8–0
|align=left| Dechapon Suwunnalird
|
|
|
|align=left|
|align=left|
|-align=center
|Win
|7–0
|align=left| Les Sherrington
|
|
|
|align=left|
|align=left|
|-align=center
|Win
|6–0
|align=left| Saiseelek Chanthanyakarn
|
|
|
|align=left|
|align=left|
|-align=center
|Win
|5–0
|align=left| Peter Brennan
|
|
|
|align=left|
|align=left|
|-align=center
|Win
|4–0
|align=left| Gerrard Zohs
|
|
|
|align=left|
|align=left|
|-align=center
|Win
|3–0
|align=left| Clint Johnson
|
|
|
|align=left|
|align=left|
|-align=center
|Win
|2–0
|align=left| Peter Brennan
|
|
|
|align=left|
|align=left|
|-align=center
|Win
|1–0
|align=left| Sean Connell
|
|
|
|align=left|
|align=left|

Coaching career
Since fighting professionally, Pittman has been focussed on coaching existing and new Australian talent as part of Team Business working with both elite and pro athletes on the Central Coast (New South Wales), including Kaye Scott and Tyson Lantry.  He is currently the National Regional Development Coach and the head of talent identification and development for Boxing Australia. Pittman's coaching experience includes being the Australian Assistant Coach at the AIBA World Junior Championships in Russia 2015 and Australian Assistant Coach at the AIBA Youth World Boxing Championships where Australia won a gold and a bronze medal. Pittman has Coached at 2 @ufc tournaments and in 2019 was named the National Futures Coach for Boxing Australia.

References

External links

Australian Olympic Team Bio

1981 births
Living people
Boxers from Brisbane
Middleweight boxers
Commonwealth Games competitors for Australia
Boxers at the 2002 Commonwealth Games
Olympic boxers of Australia
Boxers at the 2004 Summer Olympics
Australian Institute of Sport boxers
Indigenous Australian Olympians
Indigenous Australian boxers
Australian male boxers